Haines Ministry may refer to:
First Haines Ministry
Second Haines Ministry